A ward (yatkwet) is a fourth-level administrative subdivision of Myanmar's urban cities and towns, below the third-level subdivision of township. Currently, as of August 2015, there are 3,183 wards in Myanmar. In rural areas, the equivalent fourth-level unit is the village tract.

See also 
 Administrative divisions of Burma

References

Subdivisions of Myanmar
Myanmar
Myanmar